Electronix Corporation distributes electronic parts and accessories for home and business use, as well as data storage devices (under the name RaidWeb) and electronic technician information services (under the name RepairWorld). In addition, Electronix operates a computer repair/IT service division under the name Electronix Computer Center. Founded in 1986, Electronix is a privately owned small business.

History
Electronix Corporation was founded in Fairborn, Ohio in 1986 as a video rental store. Soon afterward, Electronix expanded to include electronic equipment repair and a catalog-based business selling electronic repair parts to companies and individuals, both domestically and internationally. Through its websites and catalogs, Electronix Corporation stocks over 15,000 electronic components and accessories, provides technical support to electronic repair technicians across the country, and vends large-scale data storage devices to governmental, educational, and corporate clients.

Divisions
Electronix Corporation consists of five main divisions: Electronix Online, RaidWeb, RepairWorld, Electronix Computer Center, and WeCopy.

Electronix Online
Electronix Online provides electronic parts and accessories to consumers. Major lines include semiconductor, transistor, and other varieties of chips used in electronic repair. Other lines include computer parts and accessories, soldering equipment, and other consumer electronics. (Website is broken since 2019.)

RaidWeb
RaidWeb distributes data storage products, including RAID, network-attached storage, iSCSI, and more.

RepairWorld
RepairWorld is a subscription website for electronics technicians that offers databases of electronics repairs and various user forums to discuss electronic repairs.

Electronix Computer Center
The Electronix Computer Center performs computer repairs, builds, and upgrades, and provides information technology and computer networking services in the Dayton, Ohio area.

WeCopy
WeCopy offers duplication services for CD & DVD nationwide. (Website is broken since 2016.)

Operations
Electronix Corporation markets its products worldwide through catalogs, internet sites, and mailings. All sales originate from its Fairborn, Ohio location at 1 Herald Square.

References

External links
Electronix.Com (archived December 23, 2018)
RaidWeb
RepairWorld
Electronix Computer Center - Fairborn, Ohio. Service, Sales, Repairs, Networking, Internet, Website Design
WeCopy (archived November 12, 2015)

Companies based in Dayton, Ohio
Electronics companies of the United States
Electronics companies established in 1986
1986 establishments in Ohio